USS John P. Jackson (1860) was a steamship acquired by the United States Navy during the beginning of the American Civil War. She was assigned to the Union blockade of the Confederate States of America. as well as the bombardment of Mississippi River ports.

Commissioned at the New York Navy Yard

John P. Jackson was built at Brooklyn, New York, in 1860, for ferry service.  She was the ship that ferried president-elect Abraham Lincoln across the Hudson River en route to his inauguration.  She was purchased by the Navy at Newark, New Jersey, from Jersey City Ferry Company on 6 November 1861. She was commissioned at New York Navy Yard on 14 February 1862, Lieutenant Selim E. Woodworth in command.

Civil War service

Assigned to the Gulf blockade 

John P. Jackson was ordered to Key West on 10 February to serve as one of the steamers in Comdr. David D. Porter's mother flotilla. On 30 March she arrived at Ship Island from Key West, Florida, as Flag Officer David Farragut assembled vessels for his campaign against New Orleans, Louisiana.

While Farragut labored to move his deep-draft, sea-going ships across the bar into the Mississippi River, John P. Jackson was part of the task force which secured Pass Christian, Mississippi on 4 April. During the operation she joined USS New London and USS Hatteras in driving off Confederate steamers Carondelet, Pamlico, and Oregon as they attempted to prevent the Union landing which wrested the area around Biloxi, Mississippi from the South. The same day John P. Jackson captured steamer P. C. Wallis with a cargo of naval stores.

Bombarding Forts St. Philip and Jackson
She next escorted General Butler's occupation troop ships to the Mississippi passes while towing Army transport Great Republic. Leaving the Union Army vessels at the mouth of the Mississippi to await the outcome of the impending naval effort against New Orleans, John P. Jackson joined the mortar boats for the intense bombardment of Forts St. Philip and Jackson.

The cannonade began 18 April and lasted until Farragut's ships had safely passed the Confederate batteries 6 days later, dooming the Southern riverside strongholds and the metropolis which they had fought to protect.

Sailing under fire past Vicksburg
John P. Jackson again supported Farragut when he ran the gauntlet at Vicksburg, Mississippi almost two months later to meet Flag Officer Charles Henry Davis, who had battled south along the Mississippi valley. Braving the fire of skillfully used Vicksburg cannons, Porter's flotilla peppered the Southern emplacements with shell, grape, and shrapnel throughout the daring dash.

During the fray John P. Jackson was hit twice by 7-inch rifle projectiles, leaving her without power and causing other serious damage. Moments later Clifton, coming to her aid with a towline, was struck in her starboard boiler; seven men were killed by scalding steam. John P. Jackson quickly lowered her boats to save a number of other men who had been forced overboard by the steam.

Continued blockade operations
After repairs at New Orleans, John P. Jackson was ordered to Mississippi Sound on 30 September for reconnaissance work; and she served there throughout the remainder of the war. Fire broke out in her engineering spaces on 8 October, but efficient and courageous damage control action extinguished the blaze and saved the ship. She captured sloop Young Gustave in Mississippi Sound on 21 October, and diligently performed blockade duty in the months that followed.

On 12 September 1863 she cooperated with Genesee and Calhoun in chasing steamer Fanny ashore where she was burned to prevent her falling into Union hands. The next day the same team engaged Confederate steamer Jeff Davis, forcing her to withdraw to the shelter of batteries at Grant's Pass. The Union vessels then silenced the Grant's Pass guns. John P. Jackson overhauled and took schooner Syrena bound from Biloxi, Mississippi, to Pascagoula, Mississippi, on 21 October.

Bombardment of Fort Powell
Admiral Farragut's next major objective was Mobile Bay. John P. Jackson was on hand at the outset of the campaign on 16 February 1864 when she towed three schooners into position for the bombardment of Fort Powell and then joined in the cannonade. For the next six months she operated from New Orleans supporting the operations which culminated on 5 August in Admiral Farragut's stirring victory.

John P. Jackson captured the schooner Medora in Mississippi Sound on 8 December 1864, and continued to serve in the West Gulf Blockading Squadron until after the end of the war.

Post-war decommissioning and sale
She departed Pensacola Navy Yard on 26 July 1865 and two days later arrived New Orleans, where she decommissioned 5 September. She was sold at public auction in New Orleans to Marcy, Maury & Co. on 27 September 1865. She was renamed J. P. Jackson on 3 October 1865 and was later abandoned in 1871.

See also
 Confederate States Navy

References

External links
 USS John P. Jackson

Ships of the Union Navy
Ships built in Brooklyn
Steamships of the United States Navy
Gunboats of the United States Navy
American Civil War patrol vessels of the United States
1860 ships